English alternative rock band Foals has released seven studio albums, one video album, six extended plays, thirty-three singles and thirty-seven music videos.

Albums

Studio albums

Remix albums

Video albums

Extended plays

Singles

As featured artist

Other charted songs

Remixes

Music videos

Notes

References

Discographies of British artists
Rock music group discographies